Eliel Swinton (born March 27, 1975) played running back Wendell Brown in the 1999 film Varsity Blues and is a former professional football player with the Kansas City Chiefs. He was nationally ranked as a high school football player at Montclair Prep and then played his college football at Stanford University. He signed on as an undrafted free agent to play with the Chiefs. His playing days were cut short by injury and he moved back to California to do production assistant work.

External links

1996 Stanford Cardinal player roster
FARGAS COULD LEARN FROM SWINTON SAGA

1975 births
Living people
People from West Hills, Los Angeles
American football safeties
Stanford Cardinal football players
Kansas City Chiefs players
American male film actors
Montclair College Preparatory School alumni